Lirdaf District is a district (bakhsh) in Jask County, Hormozgan Province, Iran. At the 2006 census, its population was 15,727, in 3,639 families.  The District has no cities.  The District has two rural districts (dehestan): Piveshk Rural District and Surak Rural District.

References 

Districts of Hormozgan Province
Jask County